The Statute Law Revision (Northern Ireland) Act 1980 (c 59) is an Act of the Parliament of the United Kingdom.

This Act was repealed by Group 1 of Part IX of Schedule 1 to the Statute Law (Repeals) Act 1998.

See also
Statute Law Revision Act

References
The Public General Acts and General Synod Measures 1980. HMSO. London. 1982. Part III. Page 1951.
HL Deb vol 406, cols 12 to 13, vol 410, cols 1601 to 1602, HC Deb vol 991, cols 862 to 868

United Kingdom Acts of Parliament 1980